Paracantha culta is a species of fruit fly in the family Tephritidae.

Distribution
Canada, United States.

References

Tephritinae
Insects described in 1830
Diptera of North America